Podstenjšek is a small settlement next to Podstenje in the Municipality of Ilirska Bistrica in the Inner Carniola region of Slovenia.

References

External links
Podstenjšek on Geopedia

Populated places in the Municipality of Ilirska Bistrica